Cícero Valdiran Lins Nobre (born 23 June 1992) is a Brazilian Paralympic athlete. He won the bronze medal in the men's javelin throw F57 event at the 2020 Summer Paralympics held in Tokyo, Japan.

References

Living people
1992 births
Brazilian male javelin throwers
World Para Athletics Championships winners
Medalists at the 2019 Parapan American Games
Athletes (track and field) at the 2020 Summer Paralympics
Medalists at the 2020 Summer Paralympics
Paralympic bronze medalists for Brazil
Paralympic athletes of Brazil
Paralympic medalists in athletics (track and field)
Place of birth missing (living people)
21st-century Brazilian people